Dendrocolaptes is a genus of Neotropical birds in the Dendrocolaptinae subfamily.

The genus was introduced by the French naturalist Johann Hermann in 1804. The type species was subsequently designated as the Amazonian barred woodcreeper (Dendrocolaptes certhia) by the English zoologist George Robert Gray in 1840. The name of the genus is from the Ancient Greek dendrokolaptēs meaning "woodpecker".

Species
The genus contains the following five species:

References

External links

 
Bird genera
Taxa named by Johann Hermann
Taxonomy articles created by Polbot